Mike "Moussa" Mampuya-Mawawu Willems (born 17 January 1983) is a Belgian-born Congolese professional footballer, who played as a right back.

Club career
After a career playing in Belgium, the Netherlands and Cyprus, Mampuya moved to Scotland in June 2013 and signed for Scottish First Division club Livingston on a one-year contract. He made his competitive debut for Livingston in a Scottish Challenge Cup match against Berwick Rangers on 27 July 2013. He was released in May 2014.

After leaving Livingston, Mampuya played for Broxburn Athletic between 2014-2016.

International career
On 9 February 2011, he made an appearance for the Congo DR national football team in an international friendly match against Gabon national football team.

References

External links
 

1983 births
Living people
Belgian expatriate footballers
Belgian expatriate sportspeople in Cyprus
Belgian footballers
Belgian people of Democratic Republic of the Congo descent
Democratic Republic of the Congo expatriate footballers
Democratic Republic of the Congo expatriate sportspeople in Cyprus
Democratic Republic of the Congo footballers
Democratic Republic of the Congo emigrants to Belgium
Democratic Republic of the Congo international footballers
Belgian Pro League players
Eredivisie players
Eerste Divisie players
Cypriot First Division players
Scottish Professional Football League players
K.R.C. Genk players
Lierse S.K. players
Helmond Sport players
VVV-Venlo players
Doxa Katokopias FC players
Enosis Neon Paralimni FC players
Livingston F.C. players
Broxburn Athletic F.C. players
Association football defenders
Expatriate footballers in the Netherlands
Expatriate footballers in Cyprus
Expatriate footballers in Scotland